Tortoiseshell is a material produced from the shells of species of tortoise and turtle, mainly the hawksbill sea turtle.

Tortoiseshell or tortoise shell may also refer to:

 Turtle shell, the shell of a turtle or tortoise
 Tortoiseshell cat, a cat coat coloring
 Tortoiseshell butterflies, brush-footed butterflies (Nymphalidae) in the genera Aglais and
 Nymphalis
 "Tortoiseshell", a song by The Boo Radleys which appeared on their EP Every Heaven

See also
 Small tortoiseshell, a colourful Eurasian butterfly in the family Nymphalidae
 Tortoise (disambiguation)
 Turtle (disambiguation)
 Shell (disambiguation)